Calico is an unincorporated community in Pitt County, North Carolina, United States.

History
A post office called Calico was established in 1882, and remained in operation until 1902. Calico was so named on account of the community being a trading point where calico was sold.

References

Calico

Unincorporated communities in Pitt County, North Carolina
Unincorporated communities in North Carolina